The Compositores de España International Piano Competition is held annually at Las Rozas de Madrid's Joaquín Rodrigo Auditorium since 2000. Each edition revolves around the works of a usually living Spanish composer.

Palmares
{| border="1"
|+ Prize Winners
! Year
|-
!2000 !! Honoree !! Winner  
|-
||  ||  Antón García Abril ||  Antonio Jesús Cruz 
|-
!2001 !! Honoree !! Winner
|-
|| ||  Xavier Montsalvatge ||  Calogero Di Liberto
|-
!2002 !! Honoree !! Winner
|-
|| ||  Tomás Marco ||  Federico Gianello
|-
!2003 !! Honoree !! Winner
|-
|| ||  Carlos Cruz de Castro ||  Yung Wook Yoo
|-
!2004 !! Honoree !! 1st Prize !! 2nd Prize !! 3rd Prize
|-
|| ||  Joaquín Rodrigo ||  Yevgeny Starodoubtsev ||  Julian Riem ||  Vaclav Pacl
|-
! !! !! !! !! Mention of honor
|-
|| || || || ||  Karina Azizova
|-
!2005 !! Honoree !! 1st Prize !! 2nd Prize !! 3rd Prize
|-
|| ||  Zulema de la Cruz ||  Juan Francisco Lago ||  Enrique Bernaldo de Quirós ||  Paulo Brasil
|-
! !! !! !! !! Special Prize
|-
|| || || || ||  Kumiko Yoshida-Li
|-
! !! !! !! !! Mention of Honor
|-
|| || || || ||  Alonso Orlando
|-
!2006 !! Honoree !! 1st Prize !! 2nd Prize !! 3rd Prize
|-
|| ||  Gabriel Fernández Álvez ||  Sergei Tarasov ||  Michael Namirovsky ||  Alexey Kurbatov
|-
! !! !! !! !! Mention of Honor
|-
|| || || || ||  Enrique Bernaldo de Quirós
|-
|-
!2007 !! Honoree !! 1st Prize !! 2nd Prize !! 3rd Prize
|-
|| ||  Claudio Prieto ||  Daniil Tsvetkov ||  Vakhtang Kodanashvili ||  Maria Baranova
|-
! !! !! !! !! Mention of Honor
|-
|| || || || ||  Enrique Bernaldo de Quirós
|-
!2008 !! Honoree !! 1st Prize !! 2nd Prize !! 3rd Prize
|-
|| ||  Cristóbal Halffter ||  Alexander Yakovlev ||  Evelina Borbei ||  Kazuya Saito
|-
! !! !! !! !! Mention of Honor
|-
|| || || || ||  Scipione Sangiovanni
|-
!2009 !! Honoree !! 1st Prize !! 2nd Prize !! 3rd Prize
|-
|| ||  Joaquín Turina ||  Alexei Chernov ||  Olga Kozlova ||  Ilona Timchenko
|-
! !! !! !! !! Mention of Honor
|-
|| || || || ||  Pavel Raykerus
|-
!2010 !! Honoree !! 1st Prize !! 2nd Prize !! 3rd Prize
|-
|| ||  José Zárate ||  Pavlo Kachnov ||  Arcadie Triboi ||  Pavel Raykerus
|-
! !! !! !! !! Mention of Honor
|-
|| || || || ||  Olga Kurchaeva
|-
!2011 !! Honoree !! 1st Prize !! 2nd Prize !! 3rd Prize
|-
|| ||  Salvador Brotons ||  José Ramón García Pérez ||  Yoshifumi Morita ||  Maria Yulin
|-
!2012 !! Honoree !! 1st Prize !! 2nd Prize !! 3rd Prize
|-
|| ||  Isaac Albéniz ||  Philippe Raskin ||  Kim Yedam ||  Natsuki Kishimoto
|-
!2013 !! Honoree !! 1st Prize !! 2nd Prize !! 3rd Prize
|-
|| ||  Antón García Abril ||  Kateryna Titova ||  Nikolai Saratovsky ||  Antonio Bernaldo de Quirós Yazama
|-
!2014 !! Honoree !! 1st Prize !! 2nd Prize !! 3rd Prize
|-
|| ||  Miguel Ángel Gómez Martínez ||  Su Yeon Kim ||  Ana Kipiani ||  Toghrul Huseynli
|-
!2015 !! Honoree !! 1st Prize !! 2nd Prize !! 3rd Prize
|-
|| ||  Juan Medina ||  Kirylo Korsunenko ||  Moye Chen ||  Harrison Herman
|-
!2016 !! Honoree !! 1st Prize !! 2nd Prize !! 3rd Prize
|-
|| ||  Alejandro Román ||  Pedro Lópes Salas ||  Pier Carmine Garzillo ||  Georgy Voylochnikov
|-
!2017 !! Honoree !! 1st Prize !! 2nd Prize !! 3rd Prize
|-
|| ||  Juan Manuel Ruíz ||  Evgeny Konnov ||  Harrison Herman ||  Samson Tsoy
|-
!2018 !! Honoree !! 1st Prize !! 2nd Prize !! 3rd Prize
|-
|| ||  José Luis Turina ||  Harrison Herman ||  Zixi Chen ||  Rachel Breen
|-
|}-

References

 Concurso Internacional de Piano Compositores de España
 Las Rozas de Madrid Article about the locality
History of Las Rozas

Piano competitions
Music competitions in Spain